Tarui Station is the name of two train stations in Japan:

 Tarui Station (Gifu) (垂井駅)
 Tarui Station (Osaka) (樽井駅)